The District of Branković or Vuk's Land was one of the short lived semi-independent states that emerged from the collapse of the Serbian Empire in 1371, following the death of the last Emperor Uroš the Weak (1346-1371). The founder of this realm was Vuk Branković, the son of sebastokrator Branko Mladenović who governed Ohrid under Stefan Dušan the Mighty (1331-1346). Through Vuk's marriage with Mara, the daughter of Moravian Serbia's Prince Lazar, he was given substantial lands to govern in Kosovo.

The Realm of Branković was located in the largest part of today's Kosovo and parts of Southern  Serbia. Vuk also governed eastern parts of the Raška region (including the old Serbian capital Ras) and lands in Polimlje, in present-day northern Montenegro, as well as Skoplje for a short time. After the death of Đurađ I Balšić of Zeta in 1373, Vuk captured cities of Prizren and Peć and the area of Metohija. The most important cities in Vuk's Realm were Priština, Prizren, Skopje, Peć and Ras, as well as the rich mining settlements of Novo Brdo, Trepča, Janjevo, Gluhavica and others. 
The semi-independent lordship ceased to exist as such with the establishment of Serbian Despotate by Stefan Lazarević. Still, the Branković yielded a very significant amount of power in the state, controlling most of Serbia's extremely rich ore extraction sites. Đurađ Branković inherited the title of Serbian despot as Stefan died childless.

References

District of Brankovic
Subdivisions of the Serbian Empire
Medieval Macedonia
Vassal states of the Ottoman Empire
Former monarchies